Juan José Arreola Zúñiga (September 21, 1918 – December 3, 2001) was a Mexican writer, academic, and actor. He is considered Mexico's premier experimental short story writer of the 20th century. Arreola is recognized as one of the first Latin American writers to abandon realism; he used elements of fantasy to underscore existentialist and absurdist ideas in his work. Although he is little known outside Mexico, Arreola has served as the literary inspiration for a legion of Mexican writers who have sought to transform their country's realistic literary tradition by introducing elements of magical realism, satire, and allegory. Alongside Jorge Luis Borges, he is considered one of the masters of the hybrid subgenre of the essay-story. Arreola is primarily known for his short stories and he only published one novel,  (The Fair; 1963).

Life and career

Early life
Arreola was born on September 21, 1918, in Zapotlán el Grande (modern-day Ciudad Guzmán), in the state of Jalisco. He was the fourth child out of fourteen of Felipe Arreola Mendoza and Victoria Zúñiga Chávez. In 1930, he began working as a bookbinder, which led to a series of other jobs. On the last day of 1936, Arreola moved to Mexico City after selling his Oliver typewriter and his shotgun to afford the trip.  There he entered the Theatrical School of Fine Arts.

Early career
In 1941, while working as a professor, he published his first work,  ("Christmas Dream"). In 1942 he also wrote a short story called  ("A Pact with the Devil"). In 1943, while working as a journalist, he published his second work,  ("He Did Good While He Lived"). In 1945, he collaborated with Juan Rulfo and Antonio Alatorre to publish the literary journal .

Shortly afterward, he traveled to Paris at the invitation of French actor Louis Jouvet. During this time, he became acquainted with other French actors such as Jean-Louis Barrault and Pierre Renoir. A year later he returned to Mexico.

In 1948, he worked as an editor for the main journal published by Fondo de Cultura Económica, and obtained a grant from El Colegio de México. His first collection of short stories, was published in 1949. Around 1950, he began collaborating on the anthology  and received a grant from the Rockefeller Foundation.

Later career

In 1952, Arreola published , widely considered to be his first great work. It was awarded the Jalisco Literary Prize in 1953. The following year, Arreola published La hora de todos. The year after that, he published a revised Confabulario and won the Premio del Festival Dramático from the National Institute of Fine Arts. In 1958, he published , and in 1962, . In 1962, he published "The Switchman".

In 1959 he was the founding director of the Casa del Lago, the first off-campus Cultural Center of the National Autonomous University of Mexico, now called the Casa del Lago Juan José Arreola.

In 1963, he received the Xavier Villaurrutia Prize. The same year, he published La feria, a work dense with references to his native Zapotlán El Grande, which would be remembered as one of his finest literary accomplishments. The following year, he edited the anthologies Los Presentes and El Unicornio, and became a professor at the National Autonomous University of Mexico.

In 1967, he appeared in the controversial Alejandro Jodorowsky film Fando y Lis, which after its controversial premiere was banned for a while in Mexico.

In 1969, Arreola was recognized by the José Clemente Orozco Cultural Group of Ciudad Guzmán. In 1971, Confabulario, Palindroma, La feria, and Varia invención were republished as part of a series of his greatest works, Obras de Juan José Arreola. Around 1972, he published Bestiario, a follow-up to 1958's Punta de plata. The following year, he published La palabra educación, and in 1976, Inventario.

Death
Arreola suffered from hydrocephalus, a condition that afflicted him during the last years of his life, and as a result, on December 3, 2001, he died at the age of 83 at his home in Jalisco.

Reception and legacy
In 1985, the publishing house Hyspamérica commissioned Argentine author Jorge Luis Borges to create a collection of books called  (English: "Personal Library") in which one of his choices was a selection of Arreola's short stories. Borges wrote in the prologue that if he had to define Arreola in one word it would be "liberty" and, after comparing Arreola's stories to Jonathan Swift and Franz Kafka, he also stated that Arreola was "disdainful of historical, geographical and political circumstances, in an age of suspicious and obstinate nationalism" and instead "fixed his gaze on the universe and its fantastic possibilities."

Despite his relatively small oeuvre, Arreola occupies a fixed place in 20th century Mexican and Latin American literature. Together with Juan Rulfo and Agustín Yañez, he is one of the three great narrators of his state of Jalisco. In his texts, surreal situations often develop, some of them regional, others quite worldly. In Mexico, Arreola has also become known to a wide audience as a literary commentator, especially on television. His merits as a promoter of young talent should not be underestimated.

Writers who achieved literary success in Mexico in the 1950s or 1960s came into contact with Arreola in some form, be it Carlos Fuentes, José Agustín, or José Emilio Pacheco. Arreola's texts have remained significant over the decades.

Works

Fiction
 Varia invención (short stories, 1949)
 Confabulario (short stories, 1952)
 La feria (only novel, 1963)
 Palíndroma (short stories, 1971)
 Bestiario (short stories, 1972)

Non-fiction
 La palabra educación (1973)
 Y ahora la mujer (1975)
 Inventario (1976)

Anthologies
 Confabulario total, 1941-1961 (collects the books Varia invención, Confabulario and Punta de plata, 1962)

English-language publications
 Confabulario and Other Inventions (Translated by George D. Schade, illustrated by Kelly Fearing, published by University of Texas Press, 1964)

Filmography

As actor

Awards and honors

Below is a partial list of awards and honors received by Arreola.

Awards 
 Xavier Villaurrutia Award for his novel La feria (1963)
 National Prize for Arts and Sciences in Mexico for literature and linguistics (1979).
 Jalisco Prize in Letters (1989).
 FIL Award, then known as the "Juan Rulfo Prize" (1992).
 Alfonso Reyes International Prize (1997)
 Ramón López Velarde Prize (1998)

Honors
 He was named "favorite son" of Guadalajara in 1999.
 In 2015, a statue in honor of Arreola was installed along the Rotonda de los Jaliscienses Ilustres in Guadalajara's city center.

See also
 Jorge Luis Borges
 Juan Rulfo
 Statue of Juan José Arreola
 Francisco Tario
 Julio Cortázar

References

Further reading

 Paso, Fernando del. Memoria y olvido: Vida de Juan José Arreola (1920-1947), Fondo de Cultura Económica, Mexico, 1994.
 Vale, Tere. Arreola Vale: Sus mejores conversaciones, Miguel Ángel Porrúa, Mexico, 2018.

External links
 Page at Centro Virtual Cervantes
 Short biography in Spanish
Enotes entry
 List of short stories
 Article from Encyclopædia Britannica online
Juan Jose Arreola recorded at the Library of Congress for the Hispanic Division's audio literary archive on October 14, 1960.

Mexican writers
Mexican male short story writers
Mexican short story writers
Mexican novelists
Mexican actors
Writers from Jalisco
People from Ciudad Guzmán, Jalisco
1918 births
2001 deaths